Balsam Mountain is a mountain located in the Catskill Mountains of New York south-southwest of Pine Hill. It was formally known as Sheril Mountain. Mount Sherrill is located east-southeast, and Halcott Mountain is located west-southwest of Balsam Mountain.

References

Mountains of Greene County, New York
Mountains of New York (state)